Joshua Goodall and Joseph Sirianni were the defending champions, but only Goodall competed that year.
He partnered with his compatriot Chris Eaton, but they lost to Matthew Ebden and James Ward in the quarterfinals.The top-seeded Gong Maoxin and Li Zhe defeated Yuki Bhambri and Ryler DeHeart in the final 6–3, 6–4.

Seeds

Draw

Draw

References
 Main Draw

Doubles
Chang-Sat Bangkok Open - Doubles
 in Thai tennis